Katiti Kironde was the first African woman to model on the cover of a women's magazine. As a freshman at Harvard University she was featured on the cover of Glamour's college issue in August 1968. The issue that featured Kironde on the cover remains Glamour's best-selling issue. After graduating from Harvard, Kironde further established herself within the fashion industry over three decades. Kironde launched her eponymous clothing line that focused on designing white shirts along with her husband, architect William Winder, in Boston.

She also taught a non-credit freshman course at Harvard, "An Introduction To Fashion," in 2010.

Kironde is the daughter of Apollo Kironde, who was the first Ambassador to the United Nations from Uganda.

References

Year of birth missing (living people)
Living people
American female models
Harvard University alumni
Ugandan emigrants to the United States
American fashion designers
American women fashion designers
21st-century American women